Alonso López (born May 28, 1986) is a Mexican former professional boxer. Born in Mexico City, he is the son of former world boxing champion Ricardo López.

Professional career
On November 29, 2008 López won his pro debut against Rafael Colin by knockout in Ciudad Acuña, Coahuila, Mexico.

See also
Notable boxing families

References

External links
 

Living people
1986 births
Mexican male boxers
Flyweight boxers
Boxers from Mexico City